Inna Volyanskaya (born  1966) is a former pair skater who competed for the Soviet Union. With Valery Spiridonov, she won six international medals, including gold at the 1982 Nebelhorn Trophy.

Career 

Volyanskaya/Spiridonov won silver at the 1980 St. Ivel International, gold at the 1980 Blue Swords, silver at the 1981 Prague Skate, gold at the 1982 Grand Prix International St. Gervais, and gold at the 1982 Nebelhorn Trophy. After retiring from competition, they skated together in ice shows, including Torvill & Dean and the Russian Allstars.

As of March 2017, Volyanskaya is working as a skating coach in Virginia, United States.

Personal life 
Volyanskaya was born  1966. She was formerly married to Spiridonov.

Competitive highlights 
with Spiridonov

References 

1960s births
Soviet emigrants to the United States
Soviet female pair skaters
Living people
People from Oakton, Virginia